Kangaroo is the name of two fictional characters, supervillains appearing in American comic books published by Marvel Comics. Both are noted for their leaping ability.

Publication history
The Frank Oliver version of Kangaroo was introduced in The Amazing Spider-Man #81 in 1970.

The Brian Hibbs version of Kangaroo was first seen in Cage #13 in 1993 and made his debut in The Spectacular Spider-Man #242 in 1997.

Fictional character biography

Frank Oliver

Frank Oliver was born in Sydney, Australia. As a young man, he studied kangaroos in his native Australia. Oliver lived, ate and traveled with the kangaroos, developing a leaping ability that rivaled the animals he studied. Seeing an opportunity to make money, Oliver decided to parlay his new-found leaping abilities into a boxing career. His superior speed and agility allowed him to best opponents time and again. During one match, Oliver jump-kicked one opponent in the face, severely injuring his opponent. Facing criminal charges, Oliver fled to the United States. Once he arrived, he was discovered without a passport and held for deportation.

Rather than be deported, Oliver broke free from detention and embraced a life of crime, calling himself the Kangaroo. Oliver attacked several guards and stole a briefcase containing only a vial. While the Kangaroo pocketed the vial, thinking it to contain jewels, the vial actually contained an experimental bacteria which would unleash a devastating plague if set free. The Kangaroo was unhappy with his small amount of loot, and sought out another target. While attacking a group of people for their money, the Kangaroo encountered and battled Spider-Man and lost the vial. While Spider-Man was busy with returning the vial, the Kangaroo absconded.

Oliver was later approached by Dr. Jonas Harrow who wished to enhance the Kangaroo to a superhuman level. After a seven-hour procedure, Oliver found himself gifted with air jet-enhanced leaping and punching ability. Harrow wanted to use the Kangaroo as muscle, but the newly empowered superhuman refused and left to pursue Spider-Man. Upon finding Spider-Man, the Kangaroo battled the web-slinger who had underestimated the previously underpowered enemy. As the Kangaroo was gaining the upper-hand however, Dr. Harrow activated an implant in Oliver's brain. Forced by Dr. Harrow to obey or suffer agony, the Kangaroo returned and was then ordered to retrieve a radioactive isotope. While breaking into the Hudson River lab which held the isotope, Oliver once again encountered Spider-Man. As the two battled, Spider-Man attempted to convince the Kangaroo of the isotope's radiation's dangers. Refusing to listen to his enemy, the Kangaroo burst into the room which held the isotope and was reduced to a pile of ashes upon exposure to the radiation.

Some time after his death, Arnim Zola recovered some of Oliver's DNA and created a proto-husk of the deceased villain. When Deadpool followed another proto-husk to Zola's lair, the proto-husk was used to assault Deadpool. He was the second proto-husk to die, felled by a single shot from Deadpool.

During the "Dead No More: The Clone Conspiracy" storyline, Kangaroo was cloned by the Jackal's company New U Technologies. He was involved in a fight with the other cloned villains until the clone of Prowler broke it up. He later died of clone degeneration.

Brian Hibbs

Brian Hibbs is the second person to take on the Kangaroo identity. He was first mentioned as an active operative of the crime-organization Corporation opposed by a variety of superheroes including Luke Cage, Iron Fist, Captain America, Hulk and others. Although not from Australia, Hibbs idolized the original Kangaroo, going so far as to spend years studying Frank Oliver's exploits and begin imitating his predecessor's speech and style. Hibbs adopted Oliver's costume and appearance, but decided against confronting Spider-Man. To better prepare himself to avenge his idol, Hibbs secured a job working for the Corporation as one of their agents, based out of Taylor, Mississippi. Hibbs's success against non-costumed adversaries led to his break from the Corporation and his genesis as a menace to costumed enemies. While bounding through New York City and shouting for people to get out of his way, Hibbs was knocked out by a single punch from Spider-Man who swung away literally laughing about the situation.

After escaping from custody, Hibbs then spent a sizable amount of his trust fund to purchase a suit of armor from the "Sharper Villain Catalogue". The kangaroo-themed armor enhanced his strength and leaping ability, as well as provided him with a semi-prehensile tail and a pouch-level cannon. Once again bounding through New York's streets, Hibbs was again confronted by Spider-Man. After recovering from a blow by the superhero, the Kangaroo then unveiled his pouch cannon; Spider-Man hastily webbed the cannon shut, preventing from firing. Hibbs nonetheless fired his pouch cannon, without first considering his action's consequences. The pouch cannon exploded in his crotch region, rendering him unconscious, while Spider-Man webbed him upside-down from a streetlamp.

Hibbs was freed shortly thereafter by another foe of Spider-Man, the Grizzly. The Grizzly proposed an alliance between the Kangaroo, the Spot and Gibbon as a Spider-Man Revenge Squad (a riff on the Superman Revenge Squad). Kangaroo questioned the proposal, which resulted in him receiving a swift kick to the rear. Of his three teammates, the Kangaroo found himself most in-line with the Spot as both wanted to pursue wealth from robberies rather than attack Spider-Man as Gibbon and Grizzly both wanted. After resolving their internal strife, the Spider-Man Revenge Squad then sallied forth, with the Kangaroo wearing polka dotted boxer shorts instead of his armor's destroyed bottom half. Upon encountering Spider-Man again, the team received the moniker "Legion of Losers" and was almost defeated by Spider-Man. However, Gibbon managed to cold-cock Spider-Man, with the Kangaroo landed a stomp to the hero's stomach which put out of commission. Upon returning to their secret lair, located at the Grizzly's apartment, the team was once again at strife. Grizzly and Gibbon had a change in heart and wished to return their stolen goods and go straight. Spot and Kangaroo, however, disagreed with their teammates. A battle then erupted, with the Kangaroo launching himself at Grizzly, flying through one of the Spot's spots, and smashing into a wall, knocking him out. Afterwards, Spider-Man took the Kangaroo to prison.

Once out of prison, the Kangaroo tried to further emulate his idol by gaining superhuman powers. As a result, his stature increased with a corresponding decrease in his mental faculties. As a result, he attempted to make a name for himself by playing baseball and shunning the supervillain lifestyle. Taking the name Billy Bob Jenks, the Kangaroo found fame as a professional ball player until his identity was revealed, resulting in his expulsion from the major leagues. Turning back to the supervillain path, the Kangaroo then found himself incarcerated in the Cage, a prison where superhuman powers are dampened. Once again following his idol's path, Hibbs trained to become a master combatant. While in the Cage, he made a name for himself as a fighter, alongside Batroc the Leaper, another supervillain gifted with powerful legs.

During all of this activity, Hibbs's mutation was rapidly advancing, as he gained bulk, growing to nearly nine feet in height, suffered facial deformity, and decreased in intelligence. After a short time period, Hibbs actually believed he was the original Kangaroo. As a result, he took on a very thick, almost unintelligible Australian accent.

Still in the Cage, the Kangaroo then encountered Tombstone who was suffering from heart ailments at the time. When the Kangaroo attempted to exert his influence upon Tombstone, the two ended up brawling; the fight was cut short by Tombstone suffering a heart attack. Later, Tombstone allied with several minor villains and attacked the Kangaroo, nearly injuring him with a pair of scissors, until guards broke up the altercation and sent Tombstone to solitary confinement. The Kangaroo then attacked Tombstone's friends, before hearing about a way he could revenge himself upon Tombstone proper. While Tombstone was under anesthesia, the Kangaroo could attack by crawling through the ductwork. However, this turned out to be a trap set by Tombstone: the ductwork was too narrow for the Kangaroo to squeeze into, resulting in Hibbs being stuck halfway out of the ducts. A group of inmates known as the Cruisers then found the Kangaroo in a compromising situation, which resulted in implied sodomy.

Hibbs later appears in a multi-villain fight and as one of the villains in the bar.

During the "Civil War" storyline, Hibbs was one of several attendees of an underworld summit held by Hammerhead. In this appearance, Hibbs looks much as he did in his earlier appearances, implying that he might have lost his super-strength along with his malformed features.

When Alyosha Kravinoff, began collecting a zoo of animal-themed super-beings in his container ship, Hibbs is clearly seen in one of the cages. However, after being let loose on the sinking ship along with all the others (all of which are in an unstable mental state), Hibbs is seen face-down in a pool of water presumably dead.

During the "Ends of the Earth" storyline, the Kangaroo turns up alive and was among the characters that Spider-Man rallies to help stop the construction of Otto Octavius' satellites. It was shown that after he was released, Kangaroo starts a superhero career in Australia when Spider-Man enlisted his help to disable the facilities that Doctor Octopus had built where the satellites would be constructed. When Kangaroo entered one of those facilities, he is ambushed and seemingly killed by Lady Deathstrike.

The Kangaroo is revealed to have survived when he reappears as a member of Boomerang and Owl's Sinister Sixteen, a team assembled to distract the Chameleon's forces while Boomerang steals.

Afterward, the Kangaroo is forced into committing crimes for Lady Caterpillar who had abducted one of his loved ones.

Kangaroo later teams-up with the Shocker to take advantage of a gang war raging in the Third Precinct.

In a prelude to the "Hunted" storyline, the Kangaroo is among the animal-themed characters captured by Taskmaster and Black Ant for Kraven the Hunter's upcoming Great Hunt. He was seen watching the fight between Spider-Man and Scorpion until the Hunter-Bots attacked. When Kraven the Hunter has Arcade deactivate the forcefield surrounding Central Park, the Kangaroo is among the animal-themed characters that are freed.

Powers and abilities
The Frank Oliver version of Kangaroo had his natural abilities enhanced by Jonas Harrow's implants connected to his nervous system, giving him superhuman strength in his legs and the ability to leap great heights and distances. He was also trained as a professional boxer.

The Brian Hibbs version of Kangaroo is a master hand-to-hand combatant and is at the peak of his physical condition. He has also worn a suit of armor that conveys the following attributes: enhanced strength, agility and endurance, the ability to leap great distances, a pouch-level cannon, and a semi-prehensile tail.

Reception
 In 2020, CBR.com ranked Kangaroo 2nd in their "Spider-Man: 10 Weirdest Animal Villains From The Comics That We'd Like To See In The MCU" list.
 In 2022, Screen Rant included Kangaroo in their "10 Spider-Man Villains That Are Smarter Than They Seem" list.
 In 2022, CBR.com ranked Kangaroo 5th in their "Spider-Man's 10 Funniest Villains" list.

Other versions

Spider-Man: The Manga
In Spider-Man: The Manga, the manga version of Kangaroo is a wrestler who was a wanted criminal in the United States and subsequently was kicked out of the American Pro Wrestling Association. He first fights Spider-Man and escapes. After that, he steals a medical bacteria he had mistaken for money, until he finally is defeated by Spider-Man.

Ultimate Marvel
The Ultimate Marvel version of Kangaroo (Frank Oliver) operates as a gang-boss, taking advantage of the Kingpin's misfortunes to take over territory and rackets, with Punisher killing his cousin Jake Palento in prison. The Kingpin targets the man, utilizing policewoman Jeanne De Wolfe. Various heroes confront Oliver which this leads to his arrest by De Wolfe. But as De Wolfe gloats to Oliver, the Punisher shoots the corrupt policewoman dead. Following his release from prison, the Kangaroo assaults a man who he claims owes him money. Just as he prepares to kill the man, Oliver is defeated by the new Spider-Man.

In other media

Television
 The Frank Oliver version of Kangaroo had a non-voiced cameo appearance in X-Men. He is among the mutants in "Sanctuary" that take refuge in Asteroid M, and later appeared in "Graduation Day" as a member of Magneto's army.
 The Brian Hibbs version of Kangaroo has a non-voiced cameo appearance in Ultimate Spider-Man. In the episode "The Vulture", he appears in one of Spider-Man's daydream cutaways buying coffee from Spider-Man in a café along with Lizard and Vulture, and is later actually shown on Norman Osborn's computer as one of Doctor Octopus's DNA projects along with eight other candidates.

References

External links
 
 
 Kangaroo I at Marvel.com
 Kangaroo II at Marvel.com
 Profile of the Kangaroo I at Spiderfan.org
 Profile of Kangaroo II at Spiderfan.org

Articles about multiple fictional characters
Characters created by J. M. DeMatteis
Comics characters introduced in 1970
Comics characters introduced in 1997
Characters created by John Buscema
Characters created by John Romita Sr.
Characters created by Stan Lee
Fictional assassins in comics
Fictional boxers
Fictional people from New South Wales
Marvel Comics characters with superhuman strength
Marvel Comics martial artists
Marvel Comics supervillains
Spider-Man characters